William Donald Massey Sumner (13 August 1913 – 12 May 1990), known as Donald Sumner, was a British Conservative Party politician who later became a judge. Sumner, the incumbent chairman of the divisional Conservative Association for Orpington, defeated Margaret Thatcher to be adopted prospective candidate for the local constituency.

He was elected at the 1955 Orpington by-election and was subsequently returned in the general election later that year. He remained Member of Parliament for Orpington in Kent until 1962, when he accepted an appointment as a County Court judge.

The resulting Orpington by-election was won by the Liberal Party candidate Eric Lubbock, marking the start of a revival in the fortunes of the Liberals.

References

External links

1913 births
1990 deaths
20th-century English judges
Conservative Party (UK) MPs for English constituencies
UK MPs 1955–1959
UK MPs 1959–1964
County Court judges (England and Wales)